Aethes bilbaensis is a species of moth of the family Tortricidae. It is found in Morocco, Algeria, the Iberian Peninsula, southern France, Italy, Croatia, Albania, Greece, Austria, the Czech Republic, Slovakia, Hungary, Romania, Bulgaria, Russia, Asia Minor, the Palestinian territories, Lebanon, Iran, Afghanistan, Pakistan, Kazakhstan, Kyrgyzstan and Turkmenistan. It is found in xerothermic (hot and dry) habitats.

Adults are on wing from May to June and again from July to September in two generations per year.

The larvae feed on Crithmum maritimum and Carum verticillatum. The species overwinters in the larval stage.

References

bilbaensis
Moths described in 1877
Moths of Asia
Moths of Europe
Moths of Africa